Denes Agay (June 10, 1911 - January 24, 2007) was a Hungarian-born American composer, arranger and author.

Early life and education

Agay was born and raised in a small village near Budapest and began playing piano at the age of three. In 1934 he completed his musical studies at the Franz Liszt Academy in Budapest.

Career
Agay conducted the Budapest Philharmonic Orchestra in a performance of a symphony which he composed. He worked as a film composer; one film assignment was writing the background music for Hedy Lamarr's nude scene in the 1933 film Ecstasy.

Agay was Jewish, and after the rise of Nazism, he emigrated to New York in 1939.  In 1942 he became an American citizen and joined the military, entertaining patients in the hospital wards. His parents were murdered in Auschwitz.

After the Second World War Agay worked as a teacher, composer and publisher, and as a conductor and arranger on the NBC show Guest Star. He wrote more than 90 books about musical subjects, including a multi-volume collection of piano arrangements, The Young Pianist's Library, and in 1975 produced the popular anthology, Best Loved Songs of the American People.

Agay also continued to compose. His lively Sonatina no. 3 was frequently performed by young performers at piano recitals.

Agay died in Los Altos, California in 2007 at the age of 95.

References

20th-century classical composers
Hungarian composers
Hungarian male composers
American music arrangers
1912 births
2007 deaths
American male classical composers
American classical composers
20th-century American composers
20th-century American male musicians
Hungarian emigrants to the United States